Here's the Man!!! is the second studio album by Bobby Bland, released in 1962. It was issued in standard mono, as well true stereo and was the first Duke album issued in the stereo format.  Even though the previous album, Two Steps from the Blues remains available on CD, this album hasn't been available in its entirety since 1988.

The album reached No. 53 on the Billboard Pop Albums chart.

Production
The songs were arranged by band leader Joe Scott.

Critical reception
AllMusic wrote that "Bland displays his vocal power throughout Here's the Man! using his volcanic, guttural delivery to easily work through Joe Scott's galvanizing arrangements, especially on 'Twistin' up the Road' and 'Turn on Your Love Light'." Billboard called Here's the Man! a "fine album ... which shows off [Bland's] stylish vocal treatments." In an appreciation published after Bland's death, Texas Monthly wrote: "Blues could be orchestral, blues could be lush, blues could sound as urbane as it wanted to sound."

Track listing
 "36-22-36" (Deadric Malone)
 "You're the One (That I Adore)" (Malone)
 "Turn On Your Love Light" (Malone, Joe Scott)
 "Who Will the Next Fool Be" (Charlie Rich)
 "You're Worth It All" (Malone, Vernon Morrison)
 "Blues in the Night" (Harold Arlen, Johnny Mercer)
 "Your Friends" (Malone)
 "Ain't That Lovin' You" (Malone)
 "Jelly, Jelly" (Billy Eckstine, Earl Hines)
 "Twistin' Up the Road" (Malone, Joe Veasy)
 "Stormy Monday" (T-Bone Walker)

Personnel
Bobby "Blue" Bland - vocals
Wayne Bennett - guitar
Hamp Simmons - bass
Teddy Reynolds - piano
John "Stabo" Starks - drums
L.A. Hill, Robert Skinner - tenor saxophone
Rayfield Devers - baritone saxophone
Jo Scott, Melvin Jackson - trumpet
Pluma Davis - trombone

References

1962 albums
Bobby Bland albums
Duke Records albums